Tanner Mordecai (born November 8, 1999) is an American football quarterback for the Wisconsin Badgers.

High school career
Mordecai attended Midway High School in Waco, Texas. During his career he passed for 4,797 yards and 51 touchdowns. He committed to the University of Oklahoma to play college football.

College career

Oklahoma
Mordecai played at Oklahoma from 2018 to 2020. In his first year he appeared in two games as a backup to Kyler Murray and took a redshirt. In 2019 he competed with Jalen Hurts to be the starter but lost the job and was the backup to Hurts for the season. In 2020 he again competed for the starting job, this time with Spencer Rattler, but again lost the job and spent the year as his backup. Overall he played in 12 games at Oklahoma, completing 50 of 70 passes for 639 yards and four touchdowns.

SMU
In 2021, Mordecai transferred to Southern Methodist University. In his first year at SMU, he was named the starter. In his first start, he threw for a then school-record seven passing touchdowns in a 56–9 victory over Abilene Christian. Following the 2021 season, Mordecai was selected to the American's All-Conference Second Team.

On November 5, 2022, against the Houston Cougars, Mordecai threw for a school-record 9 touchdowns, 7 of which came in the first half. The Mustangs won the game 77–63, breaking the FBS record for highest-scoring regulation game. For his performance, Mordecai was named The American's offensive player of the week.

Wisconsin
On December 30, 2022, Mordecai announced his intent to transfer to the University of Wisconsin.

Statistics
As of December 17, 2022:

References

External links
SMU Mustangs bio

Living people
Sportspeople from Waco, Texas
Players of American football from Texas
American football quarterbacks
Oklahoma Sooners football players
SMU Mustangs football players
1999 births